Darwira bin Sazan (born 11 August 1988) is a Malaysian professional football player who plays as a defender for Sabah in the Malaysia Premier League.

References

1988 births
Living people
Penang F.C. players
Sabah F.C. (Malaysia) players
Malaysian footballers
Association football defenders